Samuel Lyon Russell (July 30, 1816 – September 27, 1891) was a Whig member of the United States of America (U.S.) House of Representatives from Pennsylvania.

Samuel L. Russell (son of James McPherson Russell) was born in Bedford, Pennsylvania, in 1816.  He attended the common schools and Bedford Academy.  He graduated from Washington College in Washington, Pennsylvania, in 1834.  He studied law, was admitted to the bar in 1837 and commenced practice in Bedford.  He served as prosecuting attorney of Bedford County, Pennsylvania, during the 1840s.

Russell was elected as a Whig to the thirty-third Congress.  He was not a candidate for renomination and resumed the practice of law in Bedford.  He became a Republican upon the organization of that party in 1856.  He was a member of the State constitutional convention in 1873 and a member of the town council and the school board.  He died in Bedford in 1891 and was buried in Bedford Cemetery.

Sources

The Political Graveyard

External links 
 

1816 births
1891 deaths
People from Bedford, Pennsylvania
Pennsylvania Republicans
Washington & Jefferson College alumni
Pennsylvania lawyers
Whig Party members of the United States House of Representatives from Pennsylvania
19th-century American politicians
19th-century American lawyers